Hillsboro High School (HHS) is a coed public high school located in Hillsboro, Illinois, the county seat of Montgomery County, Illinois, in the United States. HHS is part of the Hillsboro Community Unit School District 3.

History

In 1920, it was determined that the existing city high school on Fairground Ave. was no longer acceptable. After reorganizing the school's district, the decision was made to build a new school. The contract for the building designed by architect J. W. Kennedy was awarded on June 22, 1920 at a cost of about $250,000. The construction of the "new" Hillsboro High School was begun in 1920, and the school opened in the fall of 1921.

Sitting atop a hill located at 522 East Tremont Street, the north-facing red brick building is surrounded by trees. Through the years, into at least the mid-1960s, the campus was often named as the most beautiful in Illinois.

In 1938, the gymnasium, sited to the south of the main building was commissioned with financing for the project coming in part from Works Progress Administration (WPA) funds.

The agriculture building was added in the 1950s to the east of the gym, and the library/cafeteria building opened in 1962 just southeast of the main building.

Academics
In 2010, Hillsboro High school had an average Act score of 19.6 with a graduation rate of  95.4 percent of their Senior class (which is higher than the state average of 87.8 percent). Since 2010, the school has failed to meet federal education standards set by No Child Left Behind even though in some years the school exceeds some statewide figures. The average class size is 19.6, which is smaller than the Illinois state average of 21.2.

College prep
 
Hillsboro High has Advanced Placement programs in  Calculus, Chemistry, English Literature/ Composition, and History . On the PSAE examination of 11th graders, Hillsboro scored in the 52nd percentile of Illinois schools with 49.1 percent of the students passing. This translates to a 26.4 percent college readiness score.

Departments & Programs 
Source:

HHS Departments (& Courses)
 Agriculture
 Basic Agriculture
 Agricultural Science
 Agricultural Mechanics
 Agribusiness Management
 Business
 Keyboarding & Computer Apps
 Information Processing
 Accounting
 Marketing
 Consumer Education
 Multimedia
 English
 English
 AP English
 Reader Response
 Oral
 Hilltop (Yearbook)
 Mentoring
 Family & Consumer Sciences
 Home Economics
 Foods & Nutrition
 Child Development
 Child Care
 Adult Living
 Living Environments
 Fine Arts
 Drawing
 Painting
 Design
 Photography
 Band
 Chorus

HHS Departments (cont.)
 Foreign Language
 Spanish
 Industrial Technology
 Industrial Technology
 Manufacturing
 Building Trades
 Mathematics
 Algebra
 Geometry
 Calculus
 Safety, Health & Physical Education
 Driver Education
 Sexual Education
 Physical Education
 Science
 Physical Science
 Biology
 Microbiology
 Genetics
 Anatomy & Physiology
 Environmental Science
 Chemistry
 Physics
 Social Sciences
 Western Civilization
 American History
 Sociology
 Criminal Justice
 American Government
 Current Events
 Special Education

Cooperative Programs
  With Lincoln Land College
 Certified Nurse Assistant Program
 Okaw Area Vocational Center Programs
 Auto Body
 Automotive Mechanics
 Commercial Art
 Drafting/Computer Aided Drafting
 Electronics
 Food Service
 Justice Corrections
 Machine Shop
 Office Technology
 Power Mechanics
 Welding

Student organizations & activities

Local Organizations
 Band
 Chorus
 Homecoming
 Prom
 Rembrandt Society (Illinois Student Art Association)
 Student Council

National Organizations
 Family, Career and Community Leaders of America
 Fellowship of Christian Athletes
 Future Farmers of America
 Key Club
 National Honor Society

Interscholastic athletics & activities
Hillsboro High School sponsors teams known as the Hiltoppers that compete as members of the Illinois High School Association and the South Central Conference. The team colors are orange and black and the school mascot is the Hiltopper (a mountaineer with a pick and coil of rope ).

Boys sports
 Baseball 
 Basketball (Freshman, JV & Varsity)
 Football (Freshman, JV & Varsity)
 Golf
 Soccer
 Tennis
 Track & Field
 Wrestling

Girls sports
 Basketball (Freshman, JV & Varsity)
 Cheerleading
 Golf
 Soccer
 Softball
 Tennis
 Track & Field
 Volleyball (Freshman, JV & Varsity)

Activities
 Music
 Band
 Chorus
 Scholastic Bowl

Football Archives

 1898 to 2004

Basketball archives

 1906 to 2005

More Statistics 
Statistics

Average teacher salary: $48,667

Average administration staff salary: $85,623

Dollars spent per student: $8,875

Operating expenditure for instruction: $7,229,297

Operating expenditure for supporting services: $4,499,483

Operating expenditure for administration: $459,950

Operating expenditure for other campus costs: $3,558,024

Limited English Proficient students: 0.2%

White students: 96.2%

Black students: 1.5%

Hispanic students: 1.7%

Asian students: 1.2%

Native American students: 0.0%

2 or more race students: 0.2%

Chronic truants: 30

Chronic truants rate: 5.8%

Notable alumni
William Bader
Brian Graden, television executive, MTV, VH1
Mary Hartline, model and television personality, Super Circus
Matt Hughes, two-time state champion wrestler; retired mixed martial artist, former Ultimate Fighting Championship Welterweight Champion, UFC Hall of Fame member
Ralph Isselhardt, NFL player
Harold Osborn, gold medal winner in the 1924 Summer Olympics in both the decathlon and high jump
Frank M. Ramey, U.S. Representative from Illinois
Mary Beth Zimmerman, professional golfer, 4-time winner on LPGA Tour between 1986 and 1995

External links

 Hillsboro High website

References

Public high schools in Illinois
Schools in Montgomery County, Illinois
Education in Montgomery County, Illinois